Siravo is a surname. Notable people with the surname include:

George Siravo (1916–2000), American composer, arranger, conductor, saxophonist, and clarinetist
Joseph Siravo (1955–2021), American actor, producer, and educator
Mike Siravo, American football coach